Artyom Kiyko (born 12 January 1996) is a Belarusian professional footballer who plays for Gomel.

References

External links 
 
 Profile at Dinamo Minsk website
 

1996 births
Living people
People from Marjina Horka
Sportspeople from Minsk Region
Belarusian footballers
Association football forwards
FC Dinamo Minsk players
FC Bereza-2010 players
FC Gorodeya players
FC Luch Minsk (2012) players
FC Arsenal Dzerzhinsk players
FC Gomel players